The Meadows Archeological District is a complex of four prehistoric archaeological sites in Warwick, Rhode Island.  Discovered in 1980, the sites exhibit properties associated with the procurement and processing of stone tools.  Three of the four sites include evidence of short-term habitation, and all four have shell middens.  Occupation periods from the Archaic to the Woodland Period have been assigned to them.  The district was added to the National Register of Historic Places in 1982, cited for its potential to yield new information about prehistoric Native patterns of living.

Description
The Meadows complex consists of four separate sites which abut each other, on a property that has been owned by a single family since the 18th century.  The most prominent feature of each site is a shell midden, with three of them exhibiting signs of habitation.  The sites were designated 253A-D when they were discovered during a state-funded survey in 1980, at which time a two-phase excavation of the sites was made.

The site yielded sufficient material to provide evidence of occupation between the Late Archaic and the Woodland period. It is interpreted as a temporary procurement and processing site. Site 253D is a small partially eroded midden, with a variety of scattered artifacts.

See also
National Register of Historic Places listings in Kent County, Rhode Island

References

Historic districts in Kent County, Rhode Island
Warwick, Rhode Island
Archaeological sites on the National Register of Historic Places in Rhode Island
Historic districts on the National Register of Historic Places in Rhode Island
National Register of Historic Places in Kent County, Rhode Island